Melaleuca calcicola is a plant in the myrtle family, Myrtaceae and is endemic to the south of Western Australia. It was formerly known as a subspecies of Melaleuca apodocephala but was reassessed in 2010 and raised to species status. Its branches are corky, the leaves pointed although not prickly and the flowers are creamy white, tipped with yellow.

Description
The ends are pointed although not prickly.

The flowers are white to creamy white with the tips of the stamens a contrasting yellow. The flowers are arranged in heads on the ends of branches which continue to grow after flowering and also on the sides of the branches. The stamens are arranged in five bundles around the flowers and there are 12 to 23 stamens per bundle.

Taxonomy and naming
It was raised to species status in 2010 by Craven, Lepschi and Cowley in Nuytsia. The specific epithet (calcicola) is derived from the Latin calcium meaning "calcium" hence lime and the Latin -cola meaning "dweller", referring to the preference of this species for growing on limestone.

Distribution and habitat
This melaleuca occurs between the western edge of the Nullarbor Plain and the Scaddan district in the Coolgardie, Esperance Plains and Mallee biogeographic regions growing in sand, gravel or clay on flat areas and around the edge of swamps.

Conservation status
Melaleuca calcicola is listed as "not threatened" by the Government of Western Australia Department of Parks and Wildlife.

References 

calcicola
Myrtales of Australia
Plants described in 1999
Endemic flora of Western Australia
Taxa named by Lyndley Craven